Quantum pseudo-telepathy is the fact that in certain Bayesian games with asymmetric information, players who have access to a shared physical system in an entangled quantum state, and who are able to execute strategies that are contingent upon measurements performed on the entangled physical system, are able to achieve higher expected payoffs in equilibrium than can be achieved in any mixed-strategy Nash equilibrium of the same game by players without access to the entangled quantum system.

In their 1999 paper, Gilles Brassard, Richard Cleve and Alain Tapp demonstrated that quantum pseudo-telepathy allows players in some games to achieve outcomes that would otherwise only be possible if participants were allowed to communicate during the game.

This phenomenon came to be referred to as quantum pseudo-telepathy, with the prefix pseudo referring to the fact that quantum pseudo-telepathy does not involve the exchange of information between any parties. Instead, quantum pseudo-telepathy removes the need for parties to exchange information in some circumstances.

By removing the need to engage in communication to achieve mutually advantageous outcomes in some circumstances, quantum pseudo-telepathy could be useful if some participants in a game were separated by many light years, meaning that communication between them would take many years. This would be an example of a macroscopic implication of quantum non-locality.

Quantum pseudo-telepathy is generally used as a thought experiment to demonstrate the non-local characteristics of quantum mechanics. However, quantum pseudo-telepathy is a real-world phenomenon which can be verified experimentally. It is thus an especially striking example of an experimental confirmation of Bell inequality violations.

Games of asymmetric information 
A Bayesian game is a game in which both players have imperfect information regarding the value of certain parameters. In a Bayesian game it is sometimes the case that for at least some players, the highest expected payoff achievable in a Nash equilibrium is lower than that which could have been achieved had there not have been imperfect information. Asymmetric information is a special case of imperfect information, in which different players differ in terms of the knowledge they possess regarding the value of certain parameters.

A common assumption in classical Bayesian games of asymmetric information is that all players are unaware of the values of certain crucial parameters before the game begins. Once the game begins, different players receive information regarding the value of different parameters. However, once the game begins, players are forbidden to communicate and are consequently unable to exchange the information they collectively possess regarding the game's parameters.

This assumption has a crucial implication: even if players are able to communicate and discuss strategies before the game begins, this will not enhance any player's expected payoff, because the crucial information regarding unknown parameters has not yet been 'revealed' to the game's participants. However, if the game were to be modified, so that players were permitted to communicate after the game has begun, once each player has received some information regarding the value of some of the unknown parameters, then it may be possible for the game's participants to achieve a Nash equilibrium which is Pareto optimal to any Nash equilibrium achievable in the absence of communication.

The crucial implication of quantum telepathy is that although communication before a Bayesian game of asymmetric information begins does not result in  improved equilibrium payoffs, it can be proven that in some Bayesian games, allowing players to exchange entangled qubits before the game begins can allow players to achieve a Nash equilibrium which would only otherwise be achievable if in-game communication were permitted.

The magic square game

An example of quantum pseudo-telepathy can be observed in the magic square game, introduced by Cabello and Aravind based on previous work by Mermin and Peres.

This game features two players, Alice and Bob. At the very start of the game, Alice and Bob are separated. After they are separated, communication between them is not possible. The game requires that Alice fill in one row, and Bob one column, of a 3×3 table with plus and minus signs.

Before the game begins, Alice does not know which row of the table she will be required to fill in. Similarly, Bob does not know which column he will be required to fill in.

After the two players are separated, Alice is randomly assigned one row of the table and asked to fill it with plus and minus signs. Similarly, Bob is randomly assigned one column of the table and asked to fill it with plus and minus signs.

The players are subject to the following requirement:  Alice must fill in her row such that there is an even number of minus signs in that row. Furthermore, Bob must fill in his column such that there is an odd number of minus signs in that column.

Crucially, Alice does not know which column Bob has been asked to fill in. Similarly, Bob does not know which row Alice has been asked to fill in. Thus, this game is a Bayesian game with asymmetric imperfect information, since neither player has complete information about the game (imperfect information) and both players differ in terms of the information that they do possess (asymmetric information).

Depending on the actions taken by participants, one of two outcomes can occur in this game. Either both players win, or both players lose.

If Alice and Bob place the same sign in the cell shared by their row and column, they win the game. If they place opposite signs, they lose the game.

Note that both players place all their plus and minus signs simultaneously, and neither player can see where the other player has placed their signs until the game is finished.

It can be proved that in the classic formulation of this game, there is no strategy (Nash equilibrium or otherwise) which allows the players to win the game with probability greater than 8/9. The 8/9 occurs because they can agree what value to place in 8 out of the 9 squares, but not the 9th square, which will be the shared square with probability 1/9. If Alice and Bob meet before the game begins and exchange information, this will not impact the game in any way; the best the players can do is still win with probability 8/9.

The reason why the game can only be won with probability 8/9 is that a perfectly consistent table does not exist: it would be self-contradictory, with the sum of the minus signs in the table being even based on row sums, and being odd when using column sums, or vice versa. As a further illustration, if they use the partial table shown in the diagram (supplemented by a −1 for Alice and a +1 for Bob in the missing square) and the challenge rows and columns are selected at random, they will win 8/9 of the time. No classical strategy exists which can beat this victory rate (with random row and column selection).

If the game was modified to allow Alice and Bob to communicate after they discover which row/column they have been assigned, then there would exist a set of strategies allowing both players to win the game with probability 1. However, if quantum pseudo-telepathy were used, then Alice and Bob could both win the game without communicating.

Pseudo-telepathic strategies

Use of quantum pseudo-telepathy would enable Alice and Bob to win the game 100% of the time without any communication once the game has begun.

This requires Alice and Bob to possess two pairs of particles with entangled states. These particles must have been prepared before the start of the game. One particle of each pair is held by Alice and the other by Bob, so they each have two particles. When Alice and Bob learn which column and row they must fill, each uses that information to select which measurements they should make to their particles. The result of the measurements will appear to each of them to be random (and the observed partial probability distribution of either particle will be independent of the measurement performed by the other party), so no real "communication" takes place.

However, the process of measuring the particles imposes sufficient structure on the joint probability distribution of the results of the measurement such that if Alice and Bob choose their actions based on the results of their measurement, then there will exist a set of strategies and measurements allowing the game to be won with probability 1.

Note that Alice and Bob could be light years apart from one another, and the entangled particles will still enable them to coordinate their actions sufficiently well to win the game with certainty.

Each round of this game uses up one entangled state. Playing N rounds requires that N entangled states (2N independent Bell pairs, see below) be shared in advance. This is because each round needs 2-bits of information to be measured (the third entry is determined by the first two, so measuring it isn't necessary), which destroys the entanglement. There is no way to reuse old measurements from earlier games.

The trick is for Alice and Bob to share an entangled quantum state and to use specific measurements on their components of the entangled state to derive the table entries. A suitable correlated state consists of a pair of entangled Bell states:

The symbol  represents a tensor product.

Observables for these components can be written as products of the Pauli spin matrices:

Products of these Pauli spin operators can be used to fill the 3×3 table such that each row and each column contains a mutually commuting set of observables with eigenvalues +1 and −1, and with the product of the observables in each row being the identity operator, and the product of observables in each column equating to minus the identity operator. This is a so-called Mermin–Peres magic square. It is shown in below table.

Effectively, while it is not possible to construct a 3×3 table with entries +1 and −1 such that the product of the elements in each row equals +1 and the product of elements in each column equals −1, it is possible to do so with the richer algebraic structure based on spin matrices.

The play proceeds by having each player make one measurement on their part of the entangled state per round of play. Each of Alice's measurements will give her the values for a row, and each of Bob's measurements will give him the values for a column. It is possible to do that because all observables in a given row or column commute, so there exists a basis in which they can be measured simultaneously. For Alice's first row she needs to measure both her particles in the  basis, for the second row she needs to measure them in the  basis, and for the third row she needs to measure them in an entangled basis. For Bob's first column he needs to measure his first particle in the  basis and the second in the  basis, for second column he needs to measure his first particle in the  basis and the second in the  basis, and for his third column he needs to measure both his particles in a different entangled basis, the Bell basis. As long as the table above is used, the measurement results are guaranteed to always multiply out to +1 for Alice along her row, and −1 for Bob down his column.  Of course, each completely new round requires a new entangled state, as different rows and columns are not compatible with each other.

Coordination games

In classical non-cooperative game theory a coordination game is any game with multiple Nash equilibrium. The literature regarding pseudo-telepathy occasionally refers to games such as the Mermin–Peres game as coordination games. On one hand, this is technically correct, because the classic variant of the Mermin–Peres game does feature multiple Nash equilibria.

However, quantum pseudo-telepathy does not provide any solution to the coordination problems which characterize coordination games. Quantum pseudo-telepathy's utility lies in resolving problems with asymmetric information in Bayesian games where communication is prohibited.

For example, implementing pseudo-telepathic strategies in the Mermin–Peres game can remove the need of Bob and Alice to exchange information. However, pseudo-telepathic strategies do not resolve coordination problems. Specifically, even after implementing pseudo-telepathic strategies, Bob and Alice will only win the game with probability one if they both coordinate their pseudo-telepathic strategies in a manner isomorphic to that described above.

Current research
It has been demonstrated that the above-described game is the simplest two-player game of its type in which quantum pseudo-telepathy allows a win with probability one. Other games in which quantum pseudo-telepathy occurs have been studied, including larger magic square games, graph colouring games giving rise to the notion of quantum chromatic number, and multiplayer games involving more than two participants.

In general, the win probability of a two-player nonlocal game can be improved by increasing the number of entangled qubits the players are allowed to share. It is impossible to calculate the maximum probability of winning a two-player game using quantum pseudo-telepathy, but a lower bound can be set by assuming a large, but finite, number of shared entangled qubits; an upper bound can likewise be set in terms of an equivalent framework to the nonlocal game, which is based on commuting matrices. Computation of upper and lower bounds for the maximum win probability is NP-hard. While some games may allow the maximum win probability to be computed arbitrarily closely, a claimed disproof of the Connes embedding problem implies that there are games where these bounds do not converge to a unique maximum win probability.

Recent studies tackle the question of the robustness of the effect against noise due to imperfect measurements on the coherent quantum state. Recent work has shown an exponential enhancement in the communication cost of nonlinear distributed computation, due to entanglement, when the communication channel itself is restricted to be linear.

In July 2022 a study reported the experimental demonstration of quantum pseudotelepathy via playing the nonlocal version of Mermin-Peres magic square game.

Greenberger–Horne–Zeilinger game

The Greenberger–Horne–Zeilinger (GHZ) game is another interesting example of quantum pseudo-telepathy. Classically, the game has 75% winning probability. However, with a quantum strategy, the players will always win with winning probability equals to 1. 

There are three players, Alice, Bob, and Carol playing against a referee. The referee poses a question  to each of the players. The three players each respond with an answer . The referee draws three questions x, y, z uniformly from the 4 options . As a clarification, if question triple  is chosen, then Alice receives bit 0, Bob receives bit 1, and Carol receives bit 1 from the referee. Based on the question bit received, Alice, Bob, and Carol each respond with an answer a, b, c also in the form of 0 or 1. The players can formulate a strategy together prior to the start of the game. However, no communication is allowed during the game itself.

The players win if , where  indicates OR condition and  indicates summation of answers modulo 2. In other words, the sum of three answers has to be even if . Otherwise, the sum of answers has to be odd.

Classical strategy 

Classically, Alice, Bob, and Carol can employ a deterministic strategy that always end up with odd sum (e.g. Alice always output 1. Bob and Carol always output 0).

In fact, this is the best winning strategy classically. We can only satisfy a maximum of 3 out of 4 winning conditions. Let  be Alice's response to question 0 and 1 respectively,  be Bob's response to question 0, 1, and  be Carol's response to question 0, 1. We can write all constraints that satisfy winning conditions as 

Suppose that there is a classical strategy that satisfies all four winning conditions, all four conditions hold true. Through observation, each term appears twice on the left hand side. Hence, the left side sum = 0 mod 2. However, the right side sum = 1 mod 2. The contradiction shows that all four winning conditions cannot be simultaneously satisfied.

Quantum strategy 
Now we have come to the interesting part where Alice, Bob, and Carol decided to adopt a quantum strategy. The three of them now share a tripartite entangled state , known as the GHZ state.

If question 0 is received, the player makes a measurement in the X basis . If question 1 is received, the player makes a measurement in the Y basis . In both cases, the players give answer 0 if the result of the measurement is the first state of the pair, and answer 1 if the result is the second state of the pair.

It is easy to check that with this strategy the players win the game with probability 1.

See also

Quantum game theory
Quantum refereed game
GHZ state – an entangled 3-particle state.
EPR paradox
Kochen–Specker theorem
Quantum information science
Qubit
Tsirelson's bound
Wheeler–Feynman absorber theory

Notes

External links
 Understanding and simulating quantum pseudo-telepathy
 Quantum Pseudo-Telepathy

Concepts in physics
Quantum information science
Quantum measurement
Thought experiments in quantum mechanics
Game theory